Brewbaker Technology Magnet High School, colloquially known as BrewTech, is an American high school that received the Blue Ribbon Schools Program in 2009. Brewbaker serves students in grades 9 through 12.  Brewbaker Technology Magnet High School opened in August 2000 as a product of a partnership between Montgomery County Public Schools, the Montgomery City Council, and the Montgomery Area Chamber of Commerce with funding from a series of federal and local grants. The school was also ranked #8 in Alabama as a top high school and #108 in the nation for the 2011-2012 school year. Brewtech also constantly wins Vex Robotics competitions and has many robots qualifying for state and worlds competitions each year.

The school's biggest rival is Hazel Green in the Robotics program and LAMP in other competitions.

Sports
In Spring 2011, the Varsity Girls Basketball team won the 4A AHSAA State Championship in the Birmingham-Jefferson Convention Complex Arena.
The Boys' Basketball consistently make it to the playoffs.

Statistics
Class Size Average: 23 students. Some core classes may have up to 30 students.
College Attendance: Over 97 percent of graduates attend 4-year colleges.
Enrollment: 780 Students
Faculty & Staff: Brew Tech employs a faculty and staff that includes thirty-three classroom teachers, one counselor, one media specialist, technology coordinator, and two administrators. The staff members hold master's degrees, educational specialist degrees, and one doctorate degree. Brew Tech faculty and staff members participate in an extensive professional development program through AP College Ready and other professional organizations.
Graduation Rate: 100 percent.
Scholarships Awarded: Over $1.6 million awarded to the 2008 graduating class.

Notable alumni
Ben Taylor, baseball player

References 

High schools in Montgomery, Alabama
Educational institutions established in 2000
Public high schools in Alabama
Magnet schools in Alabama
2000 establishments in Alabama